Passo Garlenda or Passo di Garlenda(2021 m) is a mountain pass in the Province of Imperia (Italy). It connects Verdeggia, located in the Argentina Valley, with Monesi di Triora, located in Tanaro Valley.

Geography 
Passo Garlenda is located on the main chain of the Alps between Monte Frontè (2152 m) and Monte Cimonasso  (2078 m). Near the pass there are some ruins of old barraks.

Hiking 
The pass is accessible by off-road mountain paths coming from the nearby valleys and is crossed by the Alta Via dei Monti Liguri, a long-distance trail from Ventimiglia (province of Imperia) to Bolano (province of La Spezia).

Mountain huts 
 Rifugio Sanremo (2,054 m)

See also

 List of mountain passes
 Cima Garlenda
 Passo Frontè

References

Garlenda
Garlenda